Baie-Trinité (2016 Population 407) is a village in the Manicouagan Regional County Municipality in the Côte-Nord region of Quebec, Canada. It is located on the coast of the Gulf of Saint Lawrence at the mouth of the Trinity River (French: Rivière de la Trinité), a salmon river which flows through the village. The major economic sectors are forestry and fisheries.

The village and municipality are named after the small Trinity Bay into which the Trinity River drains. The river's name may be attributed to Jacques Cartier who sailed by this river on Trinity Sunday in 1536. The first permanent settlers came c. 1840, and in 1898, the Baie-de-la-Trinité Mission was established.

Demographics 

Population trend:
 Population in 2016: 407 (2011 to 2016 population change: -18.8%)
 Population in 2011: 419 (2006 to 2011 population change: -20.3%)
 Population in 2006: 526
 Population in 2001: 604
 Population in 1996: 646
 Population in 1991: 651

Mother tongue:
 English as first language: 1.2%
 French as first language: 98.8%
 English and French as first language: 0%
 Other as first language: 0%

Galerie

References

Villages in Quebec
Incorporated places in Côte-Nord